La Gomera is a town, with a population of 26,533 (2018 census), and a municipality in the Escuintla department of Guatemala.

References

Municipalities of the Escuintla Department